Geng Xiaoshun (Chinese: 耿晓顺; born 17 May 1990 in Liaoning), former name Li Yang ( before 28 February 1991) is a Chinese football player who currently plays for China League One side Sichuan Jiuniu.

Club career
In 2011, Geng Xiaoshun (Li Yang) started his professional footballer career with Shenzhen Ruby in the Chinese Super League. He would eventually make his league debut for Shenzhen on 10 April 2011 in a game against Shaanxi Chanba, coming on as a substitute for Janez Zavrl in the 46th minute.

In March 2018, Geng transferred to China League Two side Jiangsu Yancheng Dingli.

Career statistics 
Statistics accurate as of match played 31 December 2020.

References

External links

1990 births
Living people
Chinese footballers
Footballers from Liaoning
Shenzhen F.C. players
Sichuan Jiuniu F.C. players
Chinese Super League players
China League One players
China League Two players
Association football defenders